Justification (also called epistemic justification) is the property of belief that qualifies it as knowledge rather than mere opinion. Epistemology is the study of reasons that someone holds a rationally admissible belief (although the term is also sometimes applied to other propositional attitudes such as doubt). Epistemologists are concerned with various epistemic features of belief, which include the ideas of warrant (a proper justification for holding a belief), knowledge, rationality, and probability, among others.

Debates surrounding epistemic justification often involve the structure of justification, including whether there are foundational justified beliefs or whether mere coherence is sufficient for a system of beliefs to qualify as justified. Another major subject of debate is the sources of justification, which might include perceptual experience (the evidence of the senses), reason, and authoritative testimony, among others.

Justification and knowledge
"Justification" involves the reasons why someone holds a belief that one should hold based on one's current evidence. Justification is a property of beliefs insofar as they are held blamelessly. In other words, a justified belief is a belief that a person is entitled to hold.

Many philosophers from Plato onward have treated "justified true belief" as constituting knowledge. It is particularly associated with a theory discussed in his dialogues Meno and Theaetetus. While in fact Plato seems to disavow justified true belief as constituting knowledge at the end of Theaetetus, the claim that Plato unquestioningly accepted this view of knowledge stuck until the proposal of the Gettier problem.

The subject of justification has played a major role in the value of knowledge as "justified true belief". Some contemporary epistemologists, such as Jonathan Kvanvig assert that justification isn't necessary in getting to the truth and avoiding errors. Kvanvig attempts to show that knowledge is no more valuable than true belief, and in the process dismissed the necessity of justification due to justification not being connected to the truth.

Conceptions of justification
William P. Alston identifies two conceptions of justification. One conception is "deontological" justification, which holds that justification evaluates the obligation and responsibility of a person having only true beliefs. This conception implies, for instance, that a person who has made his best effort but is incapable of concluding the correct belief from his evidence is still justified. The deontological conception of justification corresponds to epistemic internalism. Another conception is "truth-conducive" justification, which holds that justification is based on having sufficient evidence or reasons that entails that the belief is at least likely to be true. The truth-conductive conception of justification corresponds to epistemic externalism.

Theories of justification
There are several different views as to what entails justification, mostly focusing on the question "How sure do we need to be that our beliefs correspond to the actual world?" Different theories of justification require different conditions before a belief can be considered justified. Theories of justification generally include other aspects of epistemology, such as knowledge.

Notable theories of justification include:
 Foundationalism – Basic beliefs justify other, non-basic beliefs.
 Epistemic coherentism – Beliefs are justified if they cohere with other beliefs a person holds, each belief is justified if it coheres with the overall system of beliefs.
 Infinitism – Beliefs are justified by infinite chains of reasons.
 Foundherentism – A combination of foundationalism and epistemic coherentism, proposed by Susan Haack
 Internalism – The believer must be able to justify a belief through internal knowledge.
 Externalism – Outside sources of knowledge can be used to justify a belief.
 Reformed epistemology – Beliefs are warranted by proper cognitive function, proposed by Alvin Plantinga.
 Epistemic skepticism – A variety of viewpoints questioning the possibility of knowledge
 Evidentialism – Beliefs depend solely on the evidence for them.
 Reliabilism -   A belief is justified if it is the result of a reliable process.

Criticism of theories of justification 
Robert Fogelin claims to detect a suspicious resemblance between the theories of justification and Agrippa's five modes leading to the suspension of belief. He concludes that the modern proponents have made no significant progress in responding to the ancient modes of Pyrrhonian skepticism.

William P. Alston criticizes the very idea of a theory of justification. He claims: "There isn't any unique, epistemically crucial property of beliefs picked out by 'justified'. Epistemologists who suppose the contrary have been chasing a will-o'-the-wisp. What has really been happening is this. Different epistemologists have been emphasizing, concentrating on, "pushing" different epistemic desiderata, different features of belief that are positively valuable from the standpoint of the aims of cognition."

See also
Dream argument
Münchhausen trilemma

References

External links

Stanford Encyclopedia of Philosophy
 Stanford Encyclopedia of Philosophy entry on Foundationalist Theories of Epistemic Justification
 Stanford Encyclopedia of Philosophy entry on Epistemology, 2. What is Justification?
 Stanford Encyclopedia of Philosophy entry on Internalist vs. Externalist Conceptions of Epistemic Justification
 Stanford Encyclopedia of Philosophy entry on Coherentist Theories of Epistemic Justification

Internet Encyclopedia of Philosophy
 Internet Encyclopedia of Philosophy entry on Epistemic Justification
 Internet Encyclopedia of Philosophy entry on Epistemic Entitlement
 Internet Encyclopedia of Philosophy entry on Internalism and Externalism in Epistemology
 Internet Encyclopedia of Philosophy entry on Epistemic Consequentialism
 Internet Encyclopedia of Philosophy entry on Coherentism in Epistemology
 Internet Encyclopedia of Philosophy entry on Contextualism in Epistemology
 Internet Encyclopedia of Philosophy entry on Knowledge-First Theories of Justification

Metatheory
 
Concepts in epistemology